Avitia is a surname. Notable people with the surname include:

Francisco Avitia (1915–1995), Mexican singer and actor
Mariana Avitia (born 1993), Mexican archer